Karim El Berkaoui (born 2 July 1995) is a Moroccan footballer who plays for Al-Raed as a forward.

El Berkaoui made one unofficial appearance for the Morocco national football team in a friendly against the Central African Republic during preparations for 2018 African Nations Championship qualifying.

International career

International goals

References

External links

fctables.com

Living people
Moroccan footballers
Moroccan expatriate footballers
1995 births
Association football forwards
Hassania Agadir players
Al-Raed FC players
Botola players
Saudi Professional League players
Expatriate footballers in Saudi Arabia
Moroccan expatriate sportspeople in Saudi Arabia